Ioba is one of the 45 provinces of Burkina Faso, located in its Sud-Ouest Region. In 2019 the population was 265,876. The capital of Ioba is Dano.

Departments
Ioba is divided into 8 departments:
Dano
Dissin
Guéguéré
Koper
Niégo
Oronkua
Ouessa
Zambo

See also
Regions of Burkina Faso
Provinces of Burkina Faso
Departments of Burkina Faso

References

 
Provinces of Burkina Faso